Pruneni may refer to several villages in Romania:

 Pruneni, a village in Zărneşti Commune, Buzău County
 Pruneni, a village in Aluniş Commune, Cluj County